Rodrigo Pimentel may refer to:

Rodrigo P. Pimentel, U.S. immigration activist
Rodrigo R. Pimentel, Brazilian Military Police officer